James Fei or Fei Cheng-ting (born Taipei, Taiwan, 1974) is a contemporary classical music and electronic music composer and performer. He lives in the San Francisco Bay area.  He plays the soprano, alto, and baritone saxophones, bass clarinet and contrabass clarinet.

Recordings of his music have been released by Leo Records, Improvised Music from Japan, CRI, and Organized Sound labels.

He has worked with the composers Anthony Braxton and Alvin Lucier. Fei received a Foundation for Contemporary Arts Grants to Artists award (2014). Fei joined the faculty of Mills College in California in 2006. He graduated from Princeton University in 1996 and received his M.A. from Wesleyan University in 1999. He has collaborated with Harald Bode (posthumously).

Discography

With Anthony Braxton
 Ninetet (Yoshi's) 1997 Vol. 1 (Leo, 1997 [2002])
 Ninetet (Yoshi's) 1997 Vol. 2 (Leo, 1997 [2003])
 Ninetet (Yoshi's) 1997 Vol. 3 (Leo, 1997 [2005])
 Ninetet (Yoshi's) 1997 Vol. 4 (Leo, 1997 [2007])
With Roscoe Mitchell
Bells for the South Side (ECM, 2017)

References

External links
James Fei official website

20th-century classical composers
21st-century classical composers
1974 births
Living people
Princeton University alumni
Wesleyan University alumni
Mills College faculty
Taiwanese classical composers
American male classical composers
American classical composers
Bass clarinetists
Saxophonists
Musicians from Taipei
Musicians from the San Francisco Bay Area
21st-century American composers
20th-century saxophonists
21st-century American saxophonists
20th-century American composers
Classical musicians from California
21st-century clarinetists
20th-century American male musicians
21st-century American male musicians